Just Like You'd Leave Us, We've Left You for Dead is an EP by American hardcore punk band Death by Stereo.  The album was released October 28, 2016.

Track listing

Formats
 12" Vinyl - Black and yellow color splatter, single sided disc. Black and white album art (Europe) 
 10" Vinyl - Cream with red and green color splatter disc. Red and white album art (Australia) 
 Cassette tape - Black and red camo colored
 Compact disc - Black and white album art
 Digital

Band Line-up
 Efrem Schulz – Vocals
 Dan Palmer – Lead Guitar, Backing vocals
 JP Gericke – Rhythm guitar, Backing vocals
 Robert "Robbo" Madrigal – Bass, Backing Vocals
 Mike Cambra – Drums, Backing Vocals

Additional Credits
 Thomas Barnett of Strike Anywhere - Guest Vocals on "They Feed Us Death"

References

External links

2016 EPs
Death by Stereo EPs